José Hernández (born José Rafael Hernández y Pueyrredón; November 10, 1834 – October 21, 1886) was an Argentine journalist, poet, and politician best known as the author of the epic poem Martín Fierro.

Biography 

Hernández, whose ancestry was Spanish, was born on a farm near San Martín (Buenos Aires Province). His father was a majordomo or foreman of a series of cattle ranches. His career was to be an alternation between stints on the Federal side in the civil wars of Argentina and Uruguay and life as a newspaperman, a short stint as an employee of a commercial firm, and a period as stenographer to the legislature of the Confederation.

Hernández founded the newspaper El Río de la Plata, which advocated local autonomy, abolition of the conscripted "frontier contingents", and election of justices of the peace, military commanders, and school boards. He opposed immigration, because he believed it undermined the pastoral foundation of the region's wealth. He envisioned a federal republic based in pastoralism, but also featuring a strong system of education and a literate population.

Although a federalist opposed to the centralizing, modernizing, and Europeanizing tendencies of Argentine president Domingo Sarmiento, Hernández was no apologist for General Juan Manuel de Rosas, whom he characterized as a tyrant and a despot.

Hernández is known today almost exclusively for his masterpiece Martín Fierro, the epic poem that stands as the pinnacle of gauchesque literature. The poem was apparently begun during a period of exile in Brazil following the defeat at Ñaembé (1870) and was published in two parts (in 1872 and 1879).

Hernández died of heart disease October 21, 1886, in Belgrano, which was at that time a separate suburb, and is currently a neighborhood of the city of Buenos Aires.

He was buried in La Recoleta Cemetery in Buenos Aires.

References 
 Jorge Luis Borges, "José Hernández", in El Martín Fierro

External links 
 
 
 
 
  Historical-biographical study on José Hernández,  epílogue to the full text of Martín Fierro (Ida y Vuelta), pages 474 to 495 of the 1995 online edition of the poem (free access) by the Buenos Aires City Govt. (Spanish).

1834 births
1886 deaths
People from San Martín, Buenos Aires
Argentine journalists
19th-century Argentine poets
Argentine male poets
Argentine people of Spanish descent
Argentine people of French descent
Burials at La Recoleta Cemetery
Argentine people of Irish descent
19th-century journalists
Male journalists
19th-century male writers